European Volleyball League may refer to
 Men's European Volleyball League
 Women's European Volleyball League